Stigmodera cancellata, common name Red Spotted Jewel Beetle, is a species of beetles in the family Buprestidae.

Description
Elytra are dark greenish with six red spots and red edges, while pronotum is blackish.

Larvae live underground for up to 15 years.

Distribution
This species can be found in the western Australia.

References

Buprestidae
Beetles described in 1805